Václav Lohniský (5 November 1920 – 18 February 1980) was a Czech film actor. He appeared in 120 films and television shows between 1950 and 1980.

Selected filmography
 Případ dr. Kováře (1950)
 September Nights (1957)
 Suburban Romance (1958)
 Desire (1958)
 The Flood (1958)
 Today for the Last Time (1958)
 Dařbuján a Pandrhola (1960)
 The Pipes (1966)
 Man on Horseback (1969)
 All My Compatriots (1969)
 Jáchyme, hoď ho do stroje! (1974)
 Zaklęte rewiry (1975)
 Božská Ema (1979)

References

External links
 

1920 births
1980 deaths
People from Holice
Czech male film actors
20th-century Czech male actors
Czech theatre directors
Burials at Olšany Cemetery
Czech male stage actors